The 7th Space Warning Squadron (SWS) is the premier Space Domain Awareness sensor on the West Coast.

Mission

Space Domain Awareness
The 7th SWS is primarily responsible for Space Domain Awareness along two lines of effort: Integrated Missile Warning & Defense (IMW/D) and Space Surveillance (SSA). Their passive mission is IMW/D where they only take action after a missile event has occurred. After autonomously sensing a missile within the coverage area the crew takes action in order to warn senior leaders of threats. All other times, the crew is actively engaged with the radar equipment, tuning and managing radar energy to best acquire, discern, track, and disseminate space object observations.

Integrated Missile Warning & Defense (IMW/D)
The 7th SWS is responsible for detecting submarine-launched ballistic missiles (SLBM) fired from the Pacific Ocean and Intercontinental Ballistic Missiles. The unit then determines how many missiles in flight, probable destination, and reports to the North American Aerospace Defense Command's missile warning center, Cheyenne Mountain AFS; United States Space Command; and National Command Authority.

Speed is a key factor in day-to-day squadron activities. Within 60 seconds after detecting a launch, the crew on duty has to determine if the detection is valid, under investigation, or anomalous due to computer, mechanical or personnel error. After that, the crew determines the number of launched vehicles and provides impact predictions on North America. Once the information is determined, the unit passes updates to the appropriate authorities.

The 7th SWS's corollary mission of Missile Defense supports the Ground-Based Midcourse Defense (GMD) element of the Ballistic Missile Defense System. This program's objective is the defense of the United States against a threat of a limited strategic ballistic missile attack. The unit's Upgraded Early Warning Radar (UEWR) detects, acquires, and tracks inbound missiles to provide the necessary data to classify and engage the target. This target data allows the GMD Fire Control and Communications element to generate a weapons task plan, allowing for the engagement, interception, and negation of threat of a ballistic missile reentry vehicle in the exoatmospheric region of space.

Satellite Surveillance
As missile threats are not common, the squadron's day-to-day mission is to track earth-orbiting satellites, and reports the information to the 18th Space Control Squadron (18 SPCS) at Vandenberg Space Force Base. This information is then combined with information from other sensors to form a satellite catalog. The CSpOC uses the catalog to keep track of more than 16,000 objects in orbit. The catalog is also used to generate the United Nations Registry Report, so national and international agencies can make sure new satellites will safely launch and orbit.

Equipment

The PAVE PAWS radar uses nearly 3,600 small active antenna elements coordinated by two computers. One computer is on-line at all times, while the second automatically takes control if the first fails. The computers control the distribution of energy to the antennas to form precise patterns, allowing the radar to detect objects moving at a very high speed since no mechanical parts limit the radar sweep. The radar can change its point of focus in milliseconds, while conventional radars may take up to a minute to mechanically swing from one area to another. The main building is shaped like a pyramid with a triangular base 105 feet on each side. The two radiating faces are tilted back 20 degrees. Pave PAWS radar beams reach outward for nearly 3,000 nautical miles in a 240-degree sweep. At its extreme range, it can detect an object the size of a small car. Smaller objects can be detected at closer range.

History
The Air Force finished construction of the PAVE PAWS site at Beale in October 1979. The unit was originally part of Aerospace Defense Command 26th Aerospace Division.
In December 1979, it became part of Strategic Air Command. It attained initial operational capability in August 1980.

The unit transferred to Air Force Space Command in May 1983, eventually becoming the 7th Missile Warning Squadron. When the Air Force reorganized in 1992, the 21st Space Wing activated at Peterson AFB. The 7th MWS moved to the 21st SW and was renamed the 7th SWS. In 2007, 7th SWS completed the upgrade to Upgraded Early Warning Radar.

Previous designations
7th Space Warning Squadron (1991–present)
7th Missile Warning Squadron (1979–1991)

Assignments

Branch
United States Space Force

Functional Command
Space Operations Command

Space Delta
Space Delta 4

List of commanders

Lt Col Dale R. Madison, Aug 1996 – 1998
Lt Col Dale Shirasago, 1998 – 2000
Lt Col Dane Hollenga, 2000 – 2002
Lt Col David Sutton, 2002 – 2004
Lt Col Russell Pulliam, 2004 – 2006
Lt Col Keith Skinner, 2006 – July 2008
Lt Col Corey J. Keppler, July 2008 – 2010
Lt Col Scott M. Schroff, 2010 – 2012
Lt Col Mark J. Sorapuru, 2012 – June 2014
Lt Col Miguel A. Cruz, June 2014 – June 2016
Lt Col Jason L. Terry, June 2016 – June 2018
Lt Col Charles S. Sandusky, June 2018 – July 2020
Lt Col Blake R. Hoagland, July 2020 – June 2022
Lt Col Daniel Boyd, June 2022 – present

Decorations
Air Force Outstanding Unit Award 
1 Jan 1998 – 31 Dec 1998
1 Oct 1997 – 30 Sep 1999

References

Squadrons of the United States Space Force